Edmund Bayly House, also known as Hermitage, is a historic home located at Craddockville, Accomack County, Virginia. It was built in two stages between 1769 and 1787, and is a -story, five-bay, brick-ended frame house. It has a gable roof with dormers. The interior features fine Georgian woodwork, including an impressive parlor chimney piece with flanking cupboards, and a handsome stair. Also on the property are a contributing kitchen outbuilding, renovated for use as a guest house, and a shed.

It was added to the National Register of Historic Places in 1982.

References

External links
 Hermitage, Craddock Creek, Craddockville, Accomack County, VA: 2 photos and 2 data pages at Historic American Buildings Survey

Historic American Buildings Survey in Virginia
Houses on the National Register of Historic Places in Virginia
Colonial architecture in Virginia
Houses completed in 1787
National Register of Historic Places in Accomack County, Virginia
1787 establishments in Virginia
Houses in Accomack County, Virginia